Giardino Papadopoli is a terraced garden filled with shade trees in the Venetian sestiere of Santa Croce, between the Venezia Santa Lucia train station and Piazzale Roma. Its area is about 8,800 sq. m.

The gardens occupy the lands of the demolished monastery of Santa Croce. In 1863,  and Angelo  commissioned Marco Quignon to expand and modify the gardens. A third of its area was destroyed in 1933 when the  canal was constructed.

References

External links
 

Gardens in Veneto
Terraced gardens
1834 establishments in Italy